This is a list of episodes for Fast N' Loud Season 14. Season 14 started on March 4, 2018.

References 

2018 American television seasons